is a railway station in Fukui, Fukui, Japan, operated by West Japan Railway Company (JR West) and the private railway operator Echizen Railway.

Lines
Fukui Station is served by the following railway companies and lines:

JR West
Hokuriku Main Line
Etsumi-Hoku Line (This line formally begins at Echizen-Hanandō Station, but trains run through into this station)
Echizen Railway
Katsuyama Eiheiji Line
Mikuni Awara Line (This line formally begins at Fukuiguchi Station, but trains run through into this station)

, in front of the JR station, is served by:

Fukui Railway
Fukubu Line

It is also scheduled to become a station on the high-speed Hokuriku Shinkansen line when the extension west of  opens around 2025.

Station layout
The JR West station has a "Midori no Madoguchi" staffed ticket office.

JR West
The JR West station consists of two island platforms and five tracks located in the above-ground portion of Fukui Station.

Tracks

Echizen Railway
The Echizen Railway has two tracks serving one temporary island platform located atop the future Shinkansen viaduct until construction of its own permanent elevated station is completed.

Tracks

Adjacent stations

History

JR Fukui Station
What is now the JR West station opened on 15 July 1896. With the privatization of JNR on 1 April 1987, the station came under the control of JR West. On 18 April 2005 a new station building and "Prism Fukui" shopping mall opened.

Construction of the platforms serving the Hokuriku Shinkansen was completed in August 2022.

Echizen Railway Fukui Station
Kyoto Dentō Echizen Electric Railway Line Fukui Station opened on 21 September 1929. The station became part of the Keifuku Electric Railroad on 2 March 1942, with the line being renamed Echizen Main Line. The station became part of the Echizen Railway on 2 February 2003. Train services were restored on 20 July 2003.

Fukui Railway Fukui-eki Station
Fukui-Ekimae Station on the Fukui Railway Fukubu Line was originally located approximately 150 meters to the west of the JR station. On 27 March 2016 the station was relocated as Fukui-eki Station to the square in front of the west building of the JR station.

Surrounding area

West Exit 
Former site of Fukui Castle, now home to the Fukui Prefectural Government Building and Fukui Prefectural Police Department Headquarters
Fukui City Hall
NHK Fukui Broadcasting Station
Fukui Broadcasting Hall
Fukui International Activities Plaza
Fukui District Court
Fukui District Prosecutor's Office
Fukui Tax Office
Fukui Chamber of Commerce
Asuwayama Park

East Exit
Echizen Railway Fukui Station
AOSSA building, home to the Fukui Prefectural Civic Hall and Fukui Municipal Sakuragi Library
Wel City Fukui (Fukui Employee's Pension Hall)
Fukui Prefectural Koshi High School
Fukui Municipal Baseball Stadium
Fukui Local Meteorological Observatory

See also
 List of railway stations in Japan

References

External links

 Fukui Station (JR West official page) 
 Echizen Railway Official Website 

Railway stations in Fukui Prefecture
Stations of West Japan Railway Company
Railway stations in Japan opened in 1896